Ri Myong-guk (born 9 September 1986 in Pyongyang, North Korea) is a North Korean international footballer. He currently plays as a goalkeeper for Pyongyang City in the DPR Korea League.

He played 15 matches in 2010 World Cup qualifying for Korea DPR, including keeping a clean sheet in the decisive final group game against Saudi Arabia. After the match, he stated "I felt like I was defending the gateway to my motherland". His performances also saw him nominated for the 2009 Asian Footballer of the Year award. Ri was Korea DPR's first choice in goal in FIFA World Cup 2010. He played all Korea DPR's three World Cup matches including 7–0 loss to Portugal.
He played more than 100 official matches for his national team since his debut in 2007, making him the most capped player in the history of Korea DPR.

He was named the DPRK's best male footballer for three years running, in 2014, 2015, and 2016.

Both his father and uncle were goalkeepers for the national team.

See also
List of men's footballers with 100 or more international caps

References

External links

Ri Myong-guk at Asian Games Incheon 2014
Ri Myong-guk at DPRKFootball

1986 births
Living people
Sportspeople from Pyongyang
North Korean footballers
Association football goalkeepers
North Korea international footballers
2010 FIFA World Cup players
2011 AFC Asian Cup players
Footballers at the 2014 Asian Games
2015 AFC Asian Cup players
2019 AFC Asian Cup players
Asian Games medalists in football
Asian Games silver medalists for North Korea
Medalists at the 2014 Asian Games
FIFA Century Club